Ephrem Ashamo (Amharic: ኤፍሬም አሻሞ ) is an Ethiopian professional footballer who plays as a forward for Hawassa City SC. He has served the national team since 2014. He has older brother (Getahun) and a younger brother (Birhanu) who also professional footballers.

Club career 
Ashamo started his playing career with Muger Cement and continued his progression as he moved to other clubs like Harar Beer (Harar City) and Nigd Bank.

International career
In January 2014, coach Sewnet Bishaw, invited him to be a part of the Ethiopia squad for the 2014 African Nations Championship. The team was eliminated in the group stages after losing to Congo, Libya and Ghana.

References 

Living people
Ethiopian footballers
Ethiopia A' international footballers
2014 African Nations Championship players
1994 births
Association football forwards
Ethiopia international footballers
Mekelle 70 Enderta F.C. players
Ethiopian Premier League players